Joyce Anita Hytner   (née Myers; born December 1935) is a British theatrical fundraiser who sits on the board of the Old Vic, the Royal Court Theatre, the Criterion Theatre, the Quintessentially Foundation, Manchester International Festival, and works for the fundraising consultancy Act IV.

Early life 
Joyce Anita Myers  was born to Bernard Myers and Vera Myers (née Classick).

Career 
Hytner once worked as a publicist for Granada Television.

Personal life 
Hytner is married to retired barrister Benet Hytner, they have four children: Nicholas, Jenny, Richard and James.

Awards 
 2004 OBE for services to the arts

References 

British philanthropists
Place of birth missing (living people)
Charity fundraisers (people)
Living people
1935 births